Winkin', Blinkin' and Nod: The Kapp Recordings is a remastered compilation CD released by Geffen Records, and distributed on-line by Hip-O-Select, released in 2006.

It contains all 25 songs from the Simon Sisters' first two albums for Kapp Records: Meet the Simon Sisters (1964) and Cuddlebug (1966). A limited edition release, only 4,000 of these CDs were printed, and then it went out of print. A 12-page booklet was included, with extensive liner notes written by Carly Simon, along with several photographs of the duo.

Track listing
All songs adapted and arranged by Carly and Lucy Simon; except where indicated.

Personnel
Vocals: Lucy Simon, Carly Simon
Compilation Produced by Mike Ragogna
Executive Producer: Pat Lawrence
Mastered by Erick Labson @ Universal Mastering Studios — North Hollywood, CA
Editorial Assistance: Barry Korkin
Tape Research: Randy Aronson
Product Manager: Heather Whitten
Art Director / Production Manager: Michele Horie
Design: Greg Ross for Orabor
Photo Coordinator: Ryan Null
Photos: Peter Simon

References

External links

Carly Simon's Official Website

2006 compilation albums
The Simon Sisters albums